George Mitchell may refer to:

Entertainment
 George Mitchell (jazz musician) (1899–1972), American jazz cornet player of the 1920s
 George Mitchell (actor) (1905–1972), American film and television actor
 George Mitchell (Scottish musician) (1917–2002), Scottish singer, 1950s–1970s
 George Mitchell (music historian) (born 1944), American record producer, blues

Sports
 George Mitchell (cricketer) (1897–?), English cricketer
 George Mitchell (baseball) (1900–1953), American Negro league baseball player
 George Mitchell (water polo) (1901–1988), American water polo player
 George Mitchell (referee) (1912–?), Scottish football referee

Politics

United States

 George Edward Mitchell (1781–1832), Congressman from Maryland
 George Mitchell (Wisconsin politician) (1822–1908), member of the Wisconsin State Senate
 George A. Mitchell (1824–1878), American politician and businessman
 George Edwin Mitchell (1844–1911), mayor of Chelsea, Massachusetts
 George J. Mitchell (born 1933), United States senator from Maine and United States Special Envoy for Northern Ireland

Elsewhere

 George Mitchell (Rhodesian politician) (1867–1937), Prime Minister of Southern Rhodesia
 George Mitchell (New Zealand politician) (1877–1939), New Zealand politician
 George Herbert Mitchell, Canadian politician in the Ontario legislature
 George Mitchell (Australian politician) (1894–1961), member of the New South Wales Legislative Assembly
 George M. Mitchell (born 1932), lawyer and former political figure in Nova Scotia

Other

 George Mitchell (trade unionist) (1827–1901), leader of the National Agricultural Labourers' Union in England
 George Mitchell (priest) (1835–?), missionary priest of the Anglican Church serving in the South Africa
 George Arthur Mitchell (1860–1948), Scottish businessman
 George W. Mitchell (1904–1997), American economist, former Federal Reserve Vice Chairman
 George Hoole Mitchell (1902–1976), British geologist
 George Francis Mitchell (1912–1997), Irish geologist and naturalist
 George Allan Mitchell (1911–1944), English recipient of the Victoria Cross
George Mitchell School, school in London named after George Allan Mitchell V.C.
 George P. Mitchell (1919–2013), American businessman, real estate developer, and pioneer of shale gas technology
 George Mitchell (Irish criminal), Irish criminal nicknamed "The Penguin"